Metopoceras albarracina is a moth of the family Noctuidae. It is found in the Sierra de Albarracín, Aragon, Spain.

Adults are on wing from May to June.

The larvae feed on herbaceous species.

External links
species info

Metopoceras